The Carnival Bizarre is the third album by British doom metal band Cathedral, released in September 1995 through Earache.

Released in 1996, the related Hopkins (The Witchfinder General) EP features that titular track along with four additional songs.

Critical reception
Jem Aswald, in Trouser Press, wrote: "Pagan idolatry aside, Carnival Bizarre is Cathedral’s best and tightest album yet, rectifying many of the indulgences of the past and concentrating on throbbing grooves and viscous riffage – and a shout-out to Huggy Bear."

Track listing

Personnel

Cathedral
 Lee Dorrian – vocals, sleeve concept
 Garry Jennings – guitar, mellotron (5, 8), keyboard (4, 10), percussion (5, 10), choir (4)
 Leo Smee – bass, mellotron (3, 8), choir (4)
 Brian Dixon – drums, choir (4)

Additional musicians
 Tony Iommi – guitar (3)
 Kenny Ball – trumpet (7)
 Mitchell Dickinson – gong (3), choir (4)

Technical personnel
 Kit Woolven – production, engineering
 Doug Cook – assistant engineering
 Noel Summerville – mastering
 Dave Patchett – front cover
 Leilah Wendell – inside art
 Ray Palmer – photography
 Aston Stephens – layout

References

Cathedral (band) albums
1995 albums
Earache Records albums